The Ruhrstahl Ru 344 X-4 or Ruhrstahl-Kramer RK 344 was a wire-guided air-to-air missile designed by Germany during World War II. The X-4 did not see operational service and thus was not proven in combat but inspired considerable post-war work around the world, and was the basis for the development of several ground-launched anti-tank missiles, including the Malkara.

History

During 1943, the RAF's Bomber Command and the US Air Force mounted a series of heavy raids against Germany. Despite heavy bomber losses, these prompted Luftwaffe research into considerably more powerful anti-bomber weaponry in order to reduce the cost in lost fighter aircraft and aircrew. A massive development effort resulted in a number of heavy-calibre autocannon designs, air-to-air rockets, SAMs, and the X-4.

The idea was to build a missile with enough range to allow it to be fired from outside the range of the bombers' guns (what is now called a stand-off weapon). The missile was to be guided with enough accuracy to guarantee a "kill". The X-4 met these specifications and more.

As there was no room for a fuel pump, the fuels were forced into the motor by pistons inside long tubes, the tubes being coiled (similar to a coil spring) to fit inside the airframe. S-Stoff was so corrosive, it dissolved all base metals and was extremely difficult and dangerous to handle. The Germans planned to replace the motor with a solid fuel design as soon as possible.

The missile was spin-stabilized at about 60 rpm, or one rotation a second, so any asymmetrical thrust from the engine or inaccuracies in the control surfaces would be evened out. The wires were controlled by a joystick in the cockpit. A gyroscope kept track of "up" so control inputs from the pilot's joystick in the launch aircraft could be translated into yaw and pitch as the missile spun. Flares attached to two of the midsection wings were used to keep the missile visible through the smoke of its motor.

It was thought that the guidance system would allow the pilot to get the missile into this range in terms of pitch and yaw. But with the ranges the missile could operate at, it would be almost impossible to judge range to the target bomber anywhere near this accuracy. For this reason the missile mounted a proximity fuze known as a Kranich (Crane), using an acoustical system tuned to the 200 Hz sound of the B-17's engines in cruise, activated by the Doppler shift as the missile approached.

The first flight test occurred on August 11, 1944, using a Focke-Wulf Fw 190 for the launch platform. Subsequent tests used the Junkers Ju 88 and Messerschmitt Me 262, although they were not launched from the latter. The X-4 had originally been intended for use by single-seat fighters (including the Me 262 and possibly the Dornier Do 335), but the problems in guiding both the missile and the aircraft at the same time proved unworkable. Instead, the X-4 was re-directed to multi-seat aircraft like the Ju 88, while the unguided R4M rocket was to be used in single-seaters.

The X-4 was designed to be easily assembled by unskilled labour and airframe production began in early 1945 incorporating low-cost (non-strategic) materials, such as wood for fins. Production was hampered by Allied bombing of the BMW rocket engine factory at Stargard, though as many as 1,000 X-4s may have been completed, the missile was never officially delivered to the Luftwaffe. The fighter-interceptor designed to use this missile as its primary weapon was the Focke-Wulf Ta 183 Huckebein, which never got out of the project stage.

After the war, French engineers tried to develop a domestic version of the X-7, the Nord SS.10. 200 units were manufactured between 1947 and 1950. However, the program was disbanded due to the dangerous pre-flight refueling involved (the hypergolic nitric acid and Tonka combination was highly explosive).

Specification

X-4 air-to-air missile 
 Primary function: short-range air-to-air missile
 Propulsion: BMW 109-448 liquid rocket motor giving  thrust for 17 seconds
 Length: 
 Diameter:  (maximum)
 Wingspan: 
 Launch weight: 
 Speed: 
 Warhead:  fragmentation
 Range: 
 Fuzes: Kranich acoustic proximity fuze
 Guidance system: FuG 510/238 "Düsseldorf/Detmold" MCLOS visual guidance with wire control
 Unit cost:
 Date deployed: never

X-7 anti-tank missile
 Primary function: anti-tank guided missile
 Powerplant: solid rocket motor
 Length: 
 Diameter: 
 Wingspan:  
 Weight: 
 Speed: 
 Warhead:  hollow charge
 Range:  
 Fuzes: impact (?)
 Guidance system: MCLOS visual guidance with wire control
 Unit cost:
 Date deployed: never

See also
 List of missiles
 List of World War II guided missiles of Germany

Notes

External links

 Ruhrstahl Kramer X4 - Royal Air Force Museum, Cosford (UK)
 X4: Aircraft Launched Antiaircraft Rocket 

World War II guided missiles of Germany
Air-to-air missiles of Germany